Jehan de Braine (c. 1200 – 1240) was, jure uxoris, the Count of Mâcon and Vienne from 1224 until his death. He was a younger son of Robert II of Dreux and his second wife, Yolanta de Couci. His wife was Alix, granddaughter of William V of Mâcon. Jehan was also a trouvère and a Crusader. He followed Theobald I of Navarre to the Holy Land in the Barons' Crusade of 1239 and there died a year later. His widow sold her counties to the French crown.

Of Jehan's poetry survive one pastourelle, "Par desous l'ombre d'un bois", and two chansons d'amour, "Pensis d'amours, joians et corociés" and "Je n'os chanter trop tart ne trop souvent". Of these "Pensis d'amours" alone is preserved in mensural notation, in the Chansonnier Cangé. In the Manuscrit du Roi and the Chansonnier de Noailles the melody ends on different notes. There exist three French poems attributed to John of Brienne that are in fact the work of Jehan de Braine.

Moniot d'Arras addressed one of his chansons to Jehan, and refers to Jehan's nephew, Jehan le Roux, as Comte de Bretagne.

Notes

Further reading
Guerreau, Alain. "Jean de Braine, trouvère et dernier comte de Mâcon (1224–1240)." Annales de Bourgogne, 43(1971):81–96. 

1240 deaths
Counts of Mâcon
Counts of Vienne
Christians of the Barons' Crusade
People of the Albigensian Crusade
Christians of the Fifth Crusade
Trouvères
Year of birth uncertain
Male classical composers